The School of Nursing at Duquesne University in Pittsburgh, Pennsylvania is one of ten degree-granting bodies which make up the university. The program currently has 565 undergraduate and 282 graduate students.

History of the program
The School of Nursing was founded in 1935 as a unit in the former College of Liberal Arts and Sciences. By 1937, the School of Nursing had become an independent college, with accreditation by the State Board of Education of the Commonwealth of Pennsylvania. Initially, the college offered B.S. degrees in Nursing and Nursing Education. It continued to do so until September 1964, when a single revised professional nursing program was developed for both basic and registered nurse students. In the Fall of 1982, a new baccalaureate program was added, tailored to the needs of registered nurses. In 1986, the Graduate Nursing Program was inaugurated to offer a Master of Science degree in Nursing. In 1994, the school began to offer a Ph.D. program and in 2008 began to offer a DNP in the discipline. In 1997, the Duquesne School of Nursing was the first university in the nation to offer an online Ph.D. in nursing. To date, more than 5,000 students have graduated from the school.

Administration
Dr. Eileen Zungolo, Ed.D., R.N., FAAN is the former dean from 2002 to 2012.

The current dean of the School of Nursing is Dr. Mary Ellen Glasgow, Ph.D., R.N., ANEF, FAAN, ACNS-BC. Dr. Mary Ellen Glasgow joined the School of Nursing as Dean and Professor in August 2012. Dr. Glasgow previously served as Associate Dean for Nursing, Undergraduate Health Professions, and Continuing Education and Chair of Undergraduate Programs at Drexel University. She completed a fellowship at Bryn Mawr College and HERS, Mid-America Summer Institute for Women in Higher Education Administration.

As dean, under her leadership, enrollment and NCLEX-RN scores increased, and research and scholarship has significantly expanded. Recently, she led the development of the first dual undergraduate Biomedical Engineering and Nursing Program in the country, and a PhD in Nursing Ethics.

Distinguished Nursing Alumni 
School of Nursing alumni includes accomplished clinicians, executives, faculty, and deans such as:

 Diane Hupp, DNP, RN, NEA-BC, Chief Nursing Officer and Vice President, Operations and Patient Care Services; UPMC Children's Hospital of Pittsburgh
 Maribeth McLaughlin, BSN, MPM,  Vice President of Women's Health for UPMC and Vice President of Operations, Magee-Womens Hospital of UPMC
Margaret DiCuccio, Phd, MSN, RN, Chief Nursing Officer, Allegheny General Hospital
Anne R. Bavier, PhD, RN, FAAN, Dean, University of Connecticut; Former Dean, University of Texas, Arlington and Former President of the NLN
 Andrea Schmid-Mazzoccoli, PhD, RN, FAAN, Chief Nursing Officer, Bon Secours Health System, Robert Wood Johnson Executive Nurse Fellow
Mary Ann Cantrell, PhD, RN, CNE, Professor and Director of PhD Program, Villanova University School of Nursing; Inducted into the American Academy of Nursing 2015
Maryann Fralic, DrPH, RN, FAAN, Former Chief Nursing Officer, Professor Director, Corporate and Foundation Relations, Johns Hopkins University
Leah Laffey, DNP, RN, Chief Executive Officer, HealthSouth Rehabilitation Hospital of Sewickley
Wendy Robinson, PhD, RN, FNP-BC, CNE, President/CEO, Helene Fuld College of Nursing
Retired Major General Kimberly Siniscalachi, MSN, BSN, RN, Assistant Air Force Surgeon General, Medical Force Development; Assistant Air Force Surgeon General, Nursing Services
Joyce Marth Knestrick, PhD, C-FNP, APRN, FAANP, President, American Association of Nurse Practitioners

Recognitions
 Ranked 3 times as an NLN Center of Excellence (2008-2011, 2011-2015, 2016–2020)
72 Best Graduate Schools 2019 as ranked by U.S. News &World Report
86 Best Graduate Schools - Doctor of Nursing Practice degree 2019 as ranked by U.S. News & World Report
 #6 Graduate program ranking by U.S. News & World Report's Best Online Programs 2013
 #3 ranking by U. S. News & World Report for graduate online nursing programs for veterans in 2014
 Ranked #9 in the U. S. as a Social Media Friendly School of Nursing
 Developed 1st Dual undergraduate Biomedical Engineering and Nursing Program in the U. S. 
 2014 Military friendly school by Victory Media
 The PhD Program will celebrate its 25th Anniversary (1994-2019)
 Family Nurse Practitioner 2013 Certification Pass Rate 100%

References

External links
 

School School of Nursing
Educational institutions established in 1935
Nursing schools in Pennsylvania
1935 establishments in Pennsylvania